Lime Creek is a  waterway of Minnesota and tributary of the Des Moines River.

Lime Creek was named from the limestone rock on the creek bed.

See also
List of rivers of Minnesota

References

Rivers of Murray County, Minnesota
Rivers of Minnesota